"Phalonia" pimana is a species of moth of the family Tortricidae. It is found in North America, where it has been recorded from Arizona and California. It has also been recorded from Hispaniola.

The wingspan is about 16 mm. Adults have been recorded on wing in March and from August to September.

The larvae feed on Agave species.

References

Moths described in 1907
Cochylini